Enterprise Earth is an American deathcore band from Spokane, Washington. Former members, vocalist Dan Watson (formerly of Infant Annihilator) and guitarist BJ Sampson (formerly of Takeover), formed the band in mid-2014. At the beginning of the spring, the band finalised their deal with Attila frontman, Chris Fronzak, and moved to his record label Stay Sick Recordings, leaving former label We Are Triumphant. Since the departure of Watson in 2022, no original members remain in the band.

The band name was Watson's idea, which was inspired by his research into Illuminati and conspiracy theories.

History

On June 10, 2014, Enterprise Earth released the single "Masquerade of Angels" on the label We Are Triumphant. On October 14, Enterprise Earth released their debut EP XXIII.

On April 15, 2015, Enterprise Earth announced their first tour would be the Death Take Me Home tour, in which they would be playing from August 24 to September 8, with King Conquer, Here Comes the Kraken, Adaliah, and Dealey Plaza. On the last date of the tour, Enterprise Earth played with extra bands (excluding Adaliah): Lost Fortune, WVRM, Among Us, Worthy to Recognize, Existence Has Failed, and Agerasia.

In early 2015, the band signed to Stay Sick Recordings, leaving former label. "Transorbital Awakening" was released as the first single from Patient Ø On April 24. It featured a guest guitar solo by Joel Omans of Rings of Saturn. The second single, "Amorphous", was released on June 6, which featured guest vocals by Adam Warren of Oceano. The last single,"Theophany", was released on August 21. On October 12, Stay Sick Recordings uploaded a music video for "Shallow Breath", featuring model Erin Leigh Pribyl.

On November 12, Enterprise Earth announced they would be playing the second half of The Sleep Disorder Tour (January 16–25, 2016) with Traitors. Enterprise Earth announced that on January 20 of [The] Sleep Disorder Tour, they would be playing alongside Kings, Purge, Endings, Beggars Clarity, and Destitute; whether these bands were on other dates is unknown. On December 11, Patient 0̸ was released. It reached No. 5 on Billboards Heatseekers/Top New Artist Chart, No. 16 on their Independent Label Chart, and No. 54 on their Hard Music Chart.

Their second studio album Embodiment was released on April 14, 2017, and peaked at No. 6 on the Billboard Heatseekeers Chart.

On December 13, 2018, the band released a video for "He Exists", as an advance single to Luciferous, which was released through Entertainment One and Good Fight Music on April 5, 2019. Loudwire named it one of the 50 best metal albums of 2019.

On June 19, 2020, the band surprise released the Foundation of Bones EP. On September 10, 2021, the band announced their fourth album, The Chosen, would be due in January 2022, and also released its lead single "Where Dreams Are Broken". Shortly after, it was announced that frontman Dan Watson would be sitting out of the band's upcoming tours and would be replaced with live vocalist Travis Worland. On April 12, 2022, Watson announced he had departed the band. On May 2, touring vocalist Travis Worland was announced as the band's new permanent vocalist, and the band released their first single with him, "Psalm of Agony", the next month.

Band members

Current
 Gabe Mangold – guitars, backing vocals (2017–present)
 Brandon Zackey – drums (2019–present)
 Travis Worland – vocals (2022–present; live 2021–2022)
 Dakota Johnson – bass (2022–present; live 2021–2022)

Former live
 Sammy Morales – drums (2016)
 Josh Freeman – guitars (2017) 

Former
 Dan Watson – vocals (2014–2022)
 Byron James "BJ" Sampson – guitars (2014–2019)
 Cliff Wagle – guitars (2014–2016)
 Kevin Rogers – guitars (2014–2015)
 Conner Schneberger – bass (2014–2015)
 Ryan Folden – drums (2014–2015)
 Gordon McPherson – bass (2015–2017)
 Will Garcia – guitars (2015–2016)
 Brian Moore – bass (2015)
 Michael Davidson – drums (2015)
 Aaron O'Toole – drums (2016–2019)
 Yusef Johnson – guitars (2016–2017)
 Joel Omans – guitars (2016)
 Rob Saireh – bass (2018–2021)

Timeline

Discography 

Studio albums
Patient 0 (2015)
Embodiment (2017)
Luciferous (2019)
The Chosen (2022)

EPs
XXIII (2014)
Foundation of Bones (2020)

Singles
 "Masquerade of Angels" (2014)
 "Carol of the Bells" (2014)
 "Transorbital Awakening" (2015)
 "Amorphous" (2015)
 "Theophany" (2015)
 "This Hell, My Home" (2016)
 "Mortum Incarnatum" (2017)
 "Temptress" (2017)
 "Father of Abortion" (2017)
 "Only Hell Will Embrace the Damned" (2018)
 "He Exists" (2018)
 "Sleep Is for the Dead" (2019)
"Where Dreams Are Broken" (2021)
"Reanimate // Disintegrate" (2021)
"Legends Never Die" (2021)
"You Couldn't Save Me" (2022)
"Psalm of Agony" (2022)
"Death Magick" (2023)

Music videos

References

External links 
 

2014 establishments in Washington (state)
American deathcore musical groups
Heavy metal musical groups from Washington (state)
Musical groups established in 2014
Musical groups from Spokane
Musical quartets